Toubé Clément Dakio (born 1939) is a Burkinabé politician and President of the Union for Democracy and Development (UDD) party, a minor political party in Burkina Faso.

Dakio founded the UDD in November 2001 and has been the party's president since then. Running as the UDD candidate in the 13 November 2005 presidential election, Dakio placed 12th out of 13 candidates, receiving 0.37% of the vote.

References

1939 births
Burkinabé politicians
Living people
21st-century Burkinabé people